Sodium borohydride, also known as sodium tetrahydridoborate and sodium tetrahydroborate, is an inorganic compound with the formula NaBH4. This white solid, usually encountered as an aqueous basic solution, is a reducing agent that finds application in papermaking and dye industries. It is also used as a reagent in organic synthesis. 

The compound was discovered in the 1940s by H. I. Schlesinger, who led a team seeking volatile uranium compounds. Results of this wartime research were declassified and published in 1953.

Properties
The compound is soluble in alcohols, certain ethers, and water, although it slowly hydrolyzes.

Sodium borohydride is an odorless white to gray-white microcrystalline powder that often forms lumps. It can be purified by recrystallization from warm (50 °C) diglyme. Sodium borohydride is soluble in protic solvents such as water and lower alcohols. It also reacts with these protic solvents to produce H2; however, these reactions are fairly slow. Complete decomposition of a methanol solution requires nearly 90 min at 20 °C. It decomposes in neutral or acidic aqueous solutions, but is stable at pH 14.

Structure
NaBH4 is a salt, consisting of the tetrahedral [BH4]− anion. The solid is known to exist as three polymorphs: α, β and γ. The stable phase at room temperature and pressure is α-NaBH4, which is cubic and adopts an NaCl-type structure, in the Fmm space group. At a pressure of 6.3 GPa, the structure changes to the tetragonal β-NaBH4 (space group P421c) and at 8.9 GPa, the orthorhombic γ-NaBH4 (space group Pnma) becomes the most stable.

Synthesis and handling
For commercial NaBH4 production, the Brown-Schlesinger process and the Bayer process are the most popular methods. In the Brown-Schlesinger process sodium borohydride is industrially prepared from sodium hydride (produced by reacting Na and H2) and trimethyl borate at 250–270 °C:

B(OCH3)3 + 4 NaH → NaBH4 + 3 NaOCH3

Millions of kilograms are produced annually, far exceeding the production levels of any other hydride reducing agent.  It can also be produced from inorganic borates, including borosilicate glass and borax (Na2B4O7):
Na2B4O7 + 16 Na + 8 H2 + 7 SiO2 → 4 NaBH4 + 7 Na2SiO3

Magnesium is a less expensive reductant, and could in principle be used instead:
8 MgH2 + Na2B4O7 + Na2CO3 → 4 NaBH4 + 8 MgO + CO2
and
2 MgH2 + NaBO2 → NaBH4 + 2 MgO

Reactivity

Organic synthesis
NaBH4 reduces many organic carbonyls, depending on the precise conditions. Most typically, it is used in the laboratory for converting ketones and aldehydes to alcohols. It efficiently reduces acyl chlorides, anhydrides, α-hydroxylactones,  thioesters, and imines at room temperature or below.  It reduces esters slowly and inefficiently with excess reagent and/or elevated temperatures, while carboxylic acids and amides are not reduced at all.  NaBH4 reacts with water and alcohols, with evolution of hydrogen gas and formation of the corresponding borate, the reaction being especially fast at low pH.

Nevertheless, an alcohol, often methanol or ethanol, is generally the solvent of choice for sodium borohydride reductions of ketones and aldehydes.  The mechanism of ketone and aldehyde reduction has been scrutinized by kinetic studies, and contrary to popular depictions in textbooks, the mechanism does not involve a 4-membered transition state like alkene hydroboration, or a six-membered transition state involving a molecule of the alcohol solvent.  Hydrogen-bonding activation is required, as no reduction occurs in an aprotic solvent like diglyme.  However, the rate order in alcohol is 1.5, while carbonyl compound and borohydride are both first order, suggesting a mechanism more complex than one involving a six-membered transition state that includes only a single alcohol molecule.  It was suggested that the simultaneous activation of the carbonyl compound and borohydride occurs, via interaction with the alcohol and alkoxide ion, respectively, and that the reaction proceeds through an open transition state.

α,β-Unsaturated ketones tend to be reduced by NaBH4 in a 1,4-sense, although mixtures are often formed. Addition of cerium chloride improves the selectivity for 1,2-reduction of unsaturated ketones (Luche reduction). α,β-Unsaturated esters also undergo 1,4-reduction in the presence of NaBH4.

The NaBH4-MeOH system, formed by the addition of methanol to sodium borohydride in refluxing THF, reduces esters to the corresponding alcohols. Mixing water or an alcohol with the borohydride converts some of it into unstable hydride ester, which is more efficient at reduction, but the reductant eventually decomposes spontaneously to produce hydrogen gas and borates. The same reaction can also occur intramolecularly: an α-ketoester converts into a diol, since the alcohol produced attacks the borohydride to produce an ester of the borohydride, which then reduces the neighboring ester. 

The reactivity of NaBH4 can be enhanced or augmented by a variety of compounds.

Oxidation
Oxidation with iodine in tetrahydrofuran gives borane–tetrahydrofuran, which can reduce carboxylic acids to alcohols. 

Partial oxidation of borohydride with iodine gives octahydrotriborate:
3BH4− + I2 → B3H8− + 2H2 + 2I−

Coordination chemistry
BH4− is a ligand for metal ions. Such borohydride complexes are often prepared by the action of NaBH4 (or the LiBH4) on the corresponding metal halide. One example is the titanocene derivative:
2 (C5H5)2TiCl2 + 4 NaBH4 → 2 (C5H5)2TiBH4 + 4 NaCl + B2H6 + H2

Protonolysis and hydrolysis
In the presence of metal catalysts, sodium borohydride hydrolyzes with release of hydrogen. Exploiting this reactivity, sodium borohydride has been used in prototypes of the direct borohydride fuel cell. 
NaBH4 + 2 H2O → NaBO2 + 4 H2 (ΔH < 0)

Applications

Paper manufacture
The dominant application of sodium borohydride is the production of sodium dithionite from sulfur dioxide: Sodium dithionite is used as a bleaching agent for wood pulp and in the dyeing industry.

It has been tested as pretreatment for pulping of wood, but is too costly to be commercialized.

Chemical synthesis
Sodium borohydride reduces aldehydes and ketones to give the related alcohols. This reaction is used in the production of various antibiotics including chloramphenicol, dihydrostreptomycin, and thiophenicol. Various steroids and vitamin A are prepared using sodium borohydride in at least one step.

Niche or abandoned applications
Sodium borohydride has been considered as a way to store hydrogen for hydrogen-fueled vehicles, as it is safer (being stable in dry air) and more efficient on a weight basis than most other alternatives. The hydrogen can be released by simple hydrolysis of the borohydride.  However, this solution would need a cheap and efficient method to recycle the hydrolysis product, sodium metaborate, back to the borohydride. No such process was available as of 2007.

Although practical temperatures and pressures for hydrogen storage have not been achieved, in 2012 a core–shell nanostructure of sodium borohydride was used to store, release and reabsorb hydrogen under moderate conditions.

Skilled professional conservator/restorer have used sodium borohydride to minimize or reverse foxing in old books and documents.

See also
Many derivatives and analogues of sodium borohydride exhibit modified reactivity of value in organic synthesis.

Sodium triacetoxyborohydride, a milder reductant owing to the presence of more electron-withdrawing acetate in place of hydride.
Sodium triethylborohydride, a stronger reductant owing to the presence of electron-donating ethyl groups in place of hydride.
sodium cyanoborohydride, a milder reductant owing to the presence of more electron-withdrawing cyanide in place of hydride.  Useful for reductive aminations.

Lithium borohydride, a more strongly reducing reagent.
L-selectride (lithium tri-sec-butylborohydride), a more strongly reducing derivative.

Lithium aluminium hydride, a more strongly reducing reagent, capable of reducing esters and amides.

References

External links
National Pollutant Inventory – Boron and compounds
MSDS for Sodium Borohydride
Materials & Energy Research Institute Tokyo, Ltd.
Chemo- and stereoselectivity using Borohydride reagents
Material Safety Data Sheet

Sodium compounds
Borohydrides
Reducing agents
Substances discovered in the 1940s